The following is a list of notable competitive eaters.

Men
Beard Meats Food (alias of Adam Moran)
Patrick Bertoletti (2007–present)
Eric Booker (1997–present)
Carmen Cincotti
Dominic "The Doginator" Cardo (2001–present)
Joey Chestnut (2005–present)
Crazy Legs Conti (2002–present)
Erik "The Red" Denmark
Michael DeVito
Peter Dowdeswell
Leon Feingold (1998-2012)
Charles Hardy
Furious Pete (2004–present)
Tim Janus (2004–2016)
Edward "Cookie" Jarvis (2001–2006)
Steve Keiner
Takeru Kobayashi (2001–present)
L.A. Beast (2010–present)
Joe LaRue
Rich LeFevre (2002–present)
Don Lerman
Kevin Lipsitz
Frankie MacDonald (2012–present)
Bozo Miller
David O'Karma
Theetta Rappai
Rick The Manager
Yasir Salem (2012–present)
Bob Shoudt (1997–present)
Matt Stonie (2009–present)
Brian Subich

Women
Carlene LeFevre
Michelle Lesco
Molly Schuyler (2012–present)
Gal Sone
Miki Sudo (2011–present)
Sonya Thomas (2003–present)
Nela Zisser
Takako Akasaka

References

 
Competitive eaters
Eaters